David Brody may refer to:

David Brody (historian) (born 1930), American professor emeritus of history at the University of California-Davis
David Brody (journalist) (born 1965), Christian Broadcasting News senior national correspondent

See also
David S. Broder (1929–2011), Washington Post journalist and television pundit
David Brodie (disambiguation)